The DDA Netaji Subhash Sports Complex is a sports complex located in Jasola Vihar, New Delhi. Sports complex was inaugurated in 2000.

The sports complex has facilities to host matches of tennis, badminton, table tennis, basketball, skating, jogging track, cricket, football, swimming pool, squash and gym. It is owned by the Delhi Development Authority. It was a venue for the 2010 Commonwealth Games.

The complex is used for the preliminary round matches of DSA Senior Division.

Feature 

The total area of the plot is 8.31 hectares of land. It has wooden flooring in match courts and show courts.

 Jogging tracks
 Badminton Hard Court into Synthetic 
 Synthetic basketball courts 
 Stage Flooring for TT Hall 
 Two Squash Courts with maple wood flooring 
 Children parks 
 Gym with latest state of art equipments

See also

2010 Commonwealth Games
Jawaharlal Nehru Stadium, Delhi

References

External links
 wikimapia
 Delhi Development Authority

Sports venues in Delhi
Indoor arenas in India
South Delhi district
Table tennis in India
Sports venues completed in 2000
2000 establishments in Delhi
Swimming venues in India
Memorials to Subhas Chandra Bose